Christ Church is an evangelical Church located in the suburb of New Malden in the Royal Borough of Kingston upon Thames, Greater London. Established on 3 December 1866, Christ Church is part of the Church of England, and is located in the Kingston Episcopal Area of the Diocese of Southwark. As of August 2022, Christ Church claims a weekly attendance of 750. The current vicar is Stephen Kuhrt, serving since 2007.

New Malden was a speedily growing town, with its first seven residential streets built throughout the late 1850s. On 17 November 1865, Charles Stirling, first vicar of Christ Church, proposed its construction to the New Malden Local Board, with the opening and consecration of Christ Church taking place on 3 December 1866. The Church was enlarged with a new chancel and sacristy on 23 February 1878. On 12 November 1892, Stirling retired as vicar. Another extension to the church was built in 1966, with said hall later being demolished and replaced with a new entrance and new halls between 2017 and October 2018.

History 
New Malden was a speedily growing town, with its first seven residential streets built throughout the late 1850s. Reverend Charles Stirling, an evangelical Christian, noticed the need for a church in New Malden, and so on 17 November 1865 Stirling sent out a public notice to the New Malden Local Board requesting the permission to construct a church. He estimated that the cost would be "about £2,000". Prince George, Duke of Cambridge, owner of the land, gave it to Christ Church. The building of the Church commenced in April 1866, with its foundation stone laid on 12 June. The opening and consecration of Christ Church took place on 3 December. It was consecrated by the Diocese of Winchester, Charles Sumner, in a ceremony that was attended by a large congregation. That same day, Stirling was formally appointed as the first vicar of Christ Church.

On 23 February 1878, the Church was reopened and consecrated by the Bishop of Rochester, Anthony Thorold, after the Church was enlarged with a new chancel and sacristy. The chancel was provided by the Sim family as a memorial to their parents John Carsgoyne Sim and wife Margaretta. On 12 November 1892, Stirling resigned as vicar of Christ Church after serving for 25 years. He gave his last sermon that Sunday. That same day, the board of trustees appointed William Allen Challacombe to the vicarage of Christ Church. He arrived in New Malden in January 1893. Christ Church was once again extended in 1894, taking a form still recognisable today as of 2022.

Another extension to the church was built in 1966 on its west side, named the Vestry Hall, followed by the addition of a lounge and kitchen in 1981. New halls and a new entrance were constructed between 2017 and October 2018.

Vicars 
Since Christ Church's foundation in 1866, there have been ten vicars. The current vicar is Stephen Kuhrt, serving since 2007.

References

External links 

Churches in the Royal Borough of Kingston upon Thames